The Al Noor Mosque is a Sunni mosque in the Christchurch suburb of Riccarton in New Zealand. It was the primary target of the Christchurch mosque shootings of 15 March 2019.

History 

The Al Noor Mosque was built in 1984–1985 by the Muslim Association of Canterbury, an organization founded in 1977 that also manages the mosque building. The government of Saudi Arabia donated NZ$460,000 towards its construction.

In 2003, the Christchurch Muslim community organised a "National Māori Muslim Day" at the mosque. By 2015, the mosque had 550 members.

Terror attack 

On 15 March 2019, the site was one of two targets in a terrorist attack at Christchurch. A majority of the victims were at Al Noor: of the 51 people fatally shot and the 40 people injured overall in the attack, 44 victims died and another 35 survived gunshot wounds in the mosque. The mosque reopened on 23 March. The lone attacker was convicted of multiple murder, attempted murder, and terrorism charges on 2 June 2020, and sentenced to life in prison without parole on 27 August the same year.

Controversies 

In 2003, controversy arose within the local Muslim community over the mosque's management. The arrival of new members of Arab and Somali origin sparked tension with the earlier members of South Asian origin, who have a different culture and have a different  interpretation of Islam.

In 2014, an Australian convert was alleged by his mother and stepfather that he was introduced to radical Islam at Al Noor before going to Yemen to join al-Qaeda, an allegation denied by Hisham el-Zeiny, the mosque's imam. The president of the Federation of Islamic Associations of New Zealand, Anwar Ghani, said that mosque officials had told a Salafi follower not to promote his views there. El-Zeiny said that many Muslims were angry about US drone strikes in Yemen and that the mosque's leadership was "spending most of [its] time trying to lessen the effect."

See also 

Islam in New Zealand

References

External links

 Muslim Association of Canterbury

1980s architecture in New Zealand
1985 establishments in New Zealand
Christchurch mosque shootings
Mosques completed in 1985
Religious buildings and structures in Christchurch
Mosque buildings with domes
Sunni mosques in New Zealand